The articular tubercle (eminentia articularis) is a bony eminence on the temporal bone in the skull. It is a rounded eminence of the anterior root of the posterior end of the outer surface of the squama temporalis. This tubercle forms the front boundary of the mandibular fossa, and in the fresh state is covered with cartilage.

The mandibular condyle normally moves over the articular tubercle during physiologic maximal opening of the jaw. The articular tubercle is the site of attachment of the lateral ligament of the temporomandibular joint.

References

External links
 Image at wayne.edu
 

Bones of the head and neck